Walter Noble Zink (November 21, 1898 – June 12, 1964) was a professional baseball pitcher. He appeared in two games in Major League Baseball for the New York Giants in 1921. He also attended Amherst College. He batted and threw right-handed. He was 6'0", 165 pounds. He died on June 12, 1964 in Quincy, Massachusetts.

External links

Major League Baseball pitchers
New York Giants (NL) players
Amherst Mammoths baseball players
Baseball players from Massachusetts
Sportspeople from Pittsfield, Massachusetts
1898 births
1964 deaths